Salem's Lot is an upcoming American supernatural horror film written and directed by Gary Dauberman, based on Stephen King's 1975 novel 'Salem's Lot. Produced by New Line Cinema, Atomic Monster Productions, and Vertigo Entertainment, the film stars Lewis Pullman, Makenzie Leigh, Bill Camp, Pilou Asbæk, Alfre Woodard, and William Sadler. The plot centers on a writer who returns to his hometown of Jerusalem's Lot in search of inspiration, only to discover the presence of a vampire.

Salem's Lot is scheduled to be theatrically released in the United States by Warner Bros. Pictures.

Premise
Ben Mears is a writer who returns to his childhood home of Jerusalem's Lot in search of inspiration, only to discover his hometown is being preyed upon by a vampire, leading him to band together with a ragtag group to fight it.

Cast

 Lewis Pullman as Ben Mears
 Makenzie Leigh as Susan Norton
 Alfre Woodard as Dr. Cody
 William Sadler
 Bill Camp as Matthew Burke
 Pilou Asbæk as Richard Straker
 John Benjamin Hickey as Father Callahan
 Jordan Preston Carter as Mark Petrie
 Spencer Treat Clark as Mike Ryerson
 Nicholas Crovetti as Danny Glick
 Cade Woodward as Ralph Glick

Production
Salem's Lot is an adaptation of the 1975 novel of the same name by Stephen King. The feature film from New Line Cinema was announced in April 2019 when The Hollywood Reporter revealed Gary Dauberman was set to write the screenplay and executive produce and James Wan was attached as a producer. In an interview, Dauberman was asked if he would apply the same writing approach he utilized for It (2017) and It Chapter Two (2019), adaptations of King's novel of the same name, to which he replied, "I like to be as true to the story as I possibly can until it gets a little too unwieldy for a movie. I'm very, very excited to be a part of that and tackle it. It hasn't had the big-screen treatment yet, which is how I felt about It. It's so fun to play around with vampires and make something truly scary. I haven't seen that in a long, long time, and I'm excited for people to see it."

In April 2020, Dauberman was announced as director. In August 2021, Lewis Pullman was selected to portray the film's lead role. In September, principal photography commenced in Boston with cinematographer Michael Burgess. Filming in the state of Massachusetts took place in Ipswich and the towns of Sterling and Clinton, both within Worcester County. The Princeton Public Library in Princeton, Massachusetts, was also booked as a filming location for three days.

Additional photography occurred in late May or early June 2022.

Music 
During post-production, it was announced that Nathan Barr and Lisbeth Scott had written the score for the film.

Release
Salem's Lot was originally set to release on September 9, 2022, the post–Labor Day weekend that had been successful for the studio's past horror releases, and then on April 21, 2023, "due to COVID-related delays in the post-production realm". In August 2022, the film was pulled from the studio's release schedule with Evil Dead Rise taking its slot.

References

External links
 

Unreleased American films
2020s monster movies
2023 horror films
2023 films
American supernatural horror films
American vampire films
Films based on American novels
Films based on works by Stephen King
Films produced by James Wan
Films produced by Roy Lee
Films scored by Nathan Barr
Films shot in Boston
Films with screenplays by Gary Dauberman
New Line Cinema films
'Salem's Lot
Upcoming films
Upcoming English-language films
Vertigo Entertainment films
Warner Bros. films
2020s English-language films